Peter Gutmann or Guttman may refer to:

 Peter Gutmann (computer scientist), computer scientist from New Zealand
 Peter Gutmann (journalist) (born 1949), American journalist, writer and attorney
 Peter Guttman (photographer), American author and photographer